Sacai (stylized in lowercase) is a Japanese luxury fashion brand founded by Chitose Abe (née Chitose Sakai) in 1999. Vogue magazine has cited Sacai as influential in breaking down the dichotomy between casual and formal clothing.

History 
Abe grew up in Gifu prefecture making clothes for dolls. Her mother was a seamstress. Abe worked as a pattern cutter for Comme des Garçons and later worked for Junya Watanabe.

From 2016 to 2022, Sacai collaborated with Sophie Bille Brahe, The North Face, Beats Electronics, Apple, A.P.C., Nike and Dior.

References

See also
Dover Street Market
10 Corso Como
Colette

Clothing companies of Japan
Japanese fashion